Will Kesseler was a Luxembourgian painter, considered to be one of nation’s best Colourists.

He was born in Mersch on 17 August 1899 and died in Luxembourg on 24 September 1983.

After having taught art, he left the country for the former Belgian Congo and Chad, where he was employed as a project manager for various railway construction companies. These periods abroad deeply influenced his very varied artistic production, which includes still life, flowers, Congo and Luxembourg landscapes, figures, nudes and abstract work.

After his rather academic beginnings, the artist, who twice received the Prix Grand-Duc Adolphe (1946 and 1950), turned in 1951 to abstract painting. His Africa inspired gouaches are characterised, as are his other paintings, by expanses of solid colours, pure, vigorous, intense and luminous with strong bold contrasts in which yellow, blue, red and above all contrasting greens dominate. Dynamic geometrical, curving and undulating shapes harmoniously intersect or are superimposed, giving familiar figurative glimpses of tropical vegetation.

Sources 
 
 
 Wagener, Danièle: Will Kesseler, 1899-1983. Exposition 16 janvier-22 février 1988 à la Galerie d'Art Municipale, Villa Vauban. (Luxembourg, 1988).

External links
  5 paintings in black and white
  4 more paintings in black and white
 "View On Weimerskich"
 Painting of woman lying
 "Young Women With Turtle"
 Abstract composition

See also
 Prix Grand-Duc Adolphe
 List of Luxembourgian people

References

1899 births
1983 deaths
20th-century Luxembourgian painters
20th-century male artists
Male painters